Sherald Fergus Brownrigg (September 30, 1937 – September 20, 1996) was an American film director and producer.

Biography
Sherald Fergus Brownrigg was born September 30, 1937 in El Dorado, Arkansas.

During the 1970s he directed several low budget horror films, such as Don't Look in the Basement (1973), Don't Open the Door! (1974), and Poor White Trash Part II (1974).

In 2001, a reviewer for the Michigan Daily called Poor White Trash Part II "the worst movie of all time." Other commentators value Brownrigg's work for his ability to create thrills with a minuscule budget.

Filmography

Adaptations and sequels
 In May 2008, it was announced that a remake of 'Don't Look in the Basement''' was being planned by directors Alan Rowe Kelly and Anthony G. Sumner. Filming was scheduled for October 2008 in Indiana with a planned 2009 release. However, this film never came into fruition.
 In December 2013, a sequel titled 'Id: Don't Look in the Basement 2' was announced with Anthony Brownrigg, son of S.F. Brownrigg, directing. The film was shot in Texas in March/April 2014 and used several of the same locations from the original film. It was released in 2015.
 Director Todd Nunes's film Death Ward 13 (2017) is inspired by S.F. Brownrigg's movie The Forgotten and Edgar Allan Poe's The System of Doctor Tarr and Professor Fether''.

References

Sources

External links
 

1937 births
1996 deaths
American film directors
American film producers
Horror film directors
20th-century American businesspeople